The Classic Marvel Figurine Collection is a magazine series published by Eaglemoss Publications from 2005 to 2012, through which consumers can collect hand-painted lead figurines of the Marvel Comics characters. Bigger figurines are also produced: bulky characters like the Hulk are considered as Specials while giant characters like Galactus are called Mega Specials. Double Packs consisting of two figurines of related characters have also been released.

The collection have been released in various countries such as Australia, the United Kingdom, Ireland, Italy, Greece, France, South Africa, Spain, Brazil, Poland and the USA. Confusingly not all areas have seen the characters released in the same order. For example, depending on area, #8 features the Green Goblin or Daredevil.

Subscribers receive three other pieces of memorabilia and also special issues throughout the year. The online service, based in the United Kingdom, prohibits the items to be sold to American buyers, however the figures can be obtained through several comic book speciality stores in the United States. The collection ended with issue 200.

Issues
Each issue comes with a magazine of 20 pages (issues 1–100) which was later reduced to 16 pages (issues 101–200)and (issues 200) .

Issues are listed in the order of release from the website.

Issue 1: Spider-Man
Issue 2: Wolverine
Issue 3: Doctor Octopus
Issue 4: The Thing
Issue 5: Magneto
Issue 6: Blade
Issue 7: Silver Surfer
Issue 8: Green Goblin
Issue 9: Captain America
Issue 10: Doctor Doom
Issue 11: Jean Grey – variant available (Forbidden Planet exclusive only)
Issue 12: Iron Man
Issue 13: Daredevil
Issue 14: Storm
Issue 15: Thor
Issue 16: The Beast
Issue 17: Elektra
Issue 18: The Human Torch
Issue 19: The Punisher
Issue 20: Black Cat
Issue 21: Captain Britain
Issue 22: Ghost Rider
Issue 23: Kraven the Hunter
Issue 24: Mephisto
Issue 25: Cyclops
Issue 26: Ultron
Issue 27: Sandman
Issue 28: Mister Fantastic
Issue 29: Rogue
Issue 30: Black Panther
Issue 31: Angel – variant available (Forbidden Planet exclusive only)
Issue 32: Venom
Issue 33: Iceman
Issue 34: Red Skull
Issue 35: Gambit 
Issue 36: Namor
Issue 37: Loki
Issue 38: She-Hulk
Issue 39: Mystique
Issue 40: Doctor Strange
Issue 41: Invisible Woman
Issue 42: Nightcrawler
Issue 43: Medusa
Issue 44: Iron Fist
Issue 45: Shadowcat with Lockheed
Issue 46: Captain Marvel (Genis-Vell) – variant available
Issue 47: Emma Frost
Issue 48: The Vision
Issue 49: Bullseye
Issue 50: Hawkeye 
Issue 51: Nick Fury
Issue 52: The Lizard 
Issue 53: Polaris 
Issue 54: Nova
Issue 55: Scarlet Witch
Issue 56: Deadpool
Issue 57: Mysterio
Issue 58: Yellowjacket
Issue 59: Luke Cage
Issue 60: Super Skrull
Issue 61: Spider-Woman (Jessica Drew)
Issue 62: Electro
Issue 63: Cable
Issue 64: Dormammu
Issue 65: Black Bolt
Issue 66: Psylocke
Issue 67: The Vulture
Issue 68: Hercules
Issue 69: The Leader
Issue 70: Carnage
Issue 71: Quicksilver – variant available (exclusive in France)
Issue 72: Black Widow
Issue 73: Kang
Issue 74: Havok
Issue 75: Falcon with Redwing
Issue 76: Ms. Marvel
Issue 77: The Sentry
Issue 78: Crystal
Issue 79: Wonder Man
Issue 80: Mister Sinister
Issue 81: Mole Man
Issue 82: Moon Knight
Issue 83: Deathlok
Issue 84: Sabretooth
Issue 85: Winter Soldier
Issue 86: Scorpion 
Issue 87: Lady Deathstrike
Issue 88: Absorbing Man
Issue 89: Guardian
Issue 90: Adam Warlock
Issue 91: Shocker
Issue 92: Bishop
Issue 93: Valkyrie
Issue 94: Mandarin
Issue 95: Impossible Man
Issue 96: Nighthawk
Issue 97: Blink
Issue 98: Gladiator
Issue 99: Morbius, the Living Vampire
Issue 100: Banshee
Issue 101: War Machine
Issue 102: Hobgoblin
Issue 103: Baron Zemo
Issue 104: Taskmaster
Issue 105: Doc Samson
Issue 106: Madrox the Multiple Man
Issue 107: Union Jack         
Issue 108: Man-Wolf
Issue 109: Ikaris
Issue 110: Machine Man
Issue 111: Shang-Chi
Issue 112: Black Knight
Issue 113: Hellcat
Issue 114: Viper (Madame Hydra)
Issue 115: Dazzler
Issue 116: Chameleon
Issue 117: X-23
Issue 118: Tigra
Issue 119: Jocasta   
Issue 120: Jubilee   
Issue 121: Jack of Hearts
Issue 122: Crimson Dynamo
Issue 123: Enchantress
Issue 124: Gladiator (Melvin Potter)
Issue 125: Sunfire
Issue 126: Titania
Issue 127: Gorgon
Issue 128: X-Man
Issue 129: Ant-Man (Scott Lang)
Issue 130: Klaw 
Issue 131: Grim Reaper
Issue 132: Annihilus
Issue 133: Drax the Destroyer 
Issue 134: Son of Satan          
Issue 135: Nomad (Jack Monroe)
Issue 136: Snowbird
Issue 137: Wasp 
Issue 138: Batroc the Leaper
Issue 139: Scarlet Spider 
Issue 140: Beta Ray Bill  
Issue 141: Pyro
Issue 142: Silver Sable
Issue 143: Radioactive Man 
Issue 144: Typhoid Mary
Issue 145: Marvel Girl
Issue 146: Quasar 
Issue 147: Prowler
Issue 148: Firestar
Issue 149: Cannonball
Issue 150: Triton
Issue 151: Ares
Issue 152: Destiny
Issue 153: Balder
Issue 154: Wrecker
Issue 155: Songbird
Issue 156: Toad
Issue 157: Moondragon
Issue 158: Spiral
Issue 159: Siryn
Issue 160: Blackheart
Issue 161: Puppet Master
Issue 162: Karnak
Issue 163: Hydro-Man
Issue 164: Captain Marvel (Mar-Vell)
Issue 165: Spectrum
Issue 166: Magik
Issue 167: Beetle
Issue 168: Shanna the She-Devil
Issue 169: Forge
Issue 170: Wizard
Issue 171: Thunderbird
Issue 172: Dracula
Issue 173: Avalanche
Issue 174: Arachne
Issue 175: Mockingbird
Issue 176: Tiger Shark
Issue 177: Nico Minoru
Issue 178: Domino
Issue 179: Sif
Issue 180: J. Jonah Jameson
Issue 181: Sebastian Shaw
Issue 182: Swordsman
Issue 183: Owl
Issue 184: Hammerhead
Issue 185: Longshot
Issue 186: Trapster
Issue 187: Shaman
Issue 188: Werewolf by Night
Issue 189: Gamora
Issue 190: Vance Astro
Issue 191: Constrictor
Issue 192: Wolfsbane
Issue 193: Stingray
Issue 194: Moonstone
Issue 195: Danielle Moonstar
Issue 196: Firelord
Issue 197: Spider-Man 2099
Issue 198: Wiccan
Issue 199: Deathbird
Issue 200: Hela

Alternative Release Order 
In some areas issues 5–14 saw the figures released in a different order.

 Issue 5: Storm
 Issue 6: Iron Man
 Issue 7: Green Goblin
 Issue 8: Daredevil
 Issue 9: Doctor Doom
 Issue 10: Blade
 Issue 11: Captain America
 Issue 12: Silver Surfer
 Issue 13: Magneto
 Issue 14: Jean Grey

Variants in the collection
Issue 11: Jean Grey in red Phoenix costume: This was an exclusive only available to subscribers and through Forbidden Planet.
Issue 31: Angel in blue-and-white costume with blue face: This was an exclusive only available to subscribers and through Forbidden Planet.
Issue 41:Invisible Woman in Power Invisible White costume: This was an exclusive only available to subscribers 
Issue 46: Captain Marvel Exclusive to Diamond Comic Distributors customers. Titled the "Previews Exclusive Variant" or "PX Variant"  
Issue 71: Quicksilver Green Costume. Exclusive in France.''Special Issue 1:''' The Incredible Hulk – grey-skin Hulk

Specials
 Subscriber Exclusive: Red Costume Spider-Man
 Issue 1: The Incredible Hulk – variant available; see above
 Issue 2: Juggernaut
 Issue 3: Colossus
 Issue 4: Thanos
 Issue 5: Black Costume Spider-Man
 Issue 6: Apocalypse
 Issue 7: Rhino
 Issue 8: Iron Man (1st Appearance Movie Version)
 Issue 9: Abomination
 Issue 10: Man-Thing
 Issue 11: Kingpin
 Issue 12: Destroyer (70th Anniversary Special)
 Issue 13: Cloak and Dagger (on a shared base)
 Issue 14: Ronan the Accuser
 Issue 15: Omega Red
 Issue 16: Sauron
 Issue 17: Odin
 Issue 18: Terrax the Tamer
 Issue 19: Giant-Man (Henry Pym)
 Issue 20: Skurge the Executioner

Mega-Specials
 Issue 1: Galactus
 Issue 2: Sentinel
 Issue 3: Watcher
 Issue 4: Fin Fang Foom
 Issue 5: Blob
 Issue 6: M.O.D.O.K.
 Issue 7: Mojo

Double Packs
 Issue 1: Professor Xavier and Lilandra
 Issue 2: Ka-Zar and Zabu
 Issue 3: Sasquatch and Puck
 Issue 4: Northstar and Aurora

Awards
The Classic Marvel Figurine Collection won the "Magazine of the Year" award in the Diamond Gem Awards 2007.

Credits
Editors in order of stewardship: Alan Cowsill, Richard Jackson, John Tomlinson, Sven Wilson

Art Editors: Dan Rachael, Gary Gilbert, Colin Willams

See also
DC Comics Super Hero Collection
Marvel Fact Files

Notes

External links
http://marvel-figurines.blogspot.com/ - Editor of the CMFC's official blog
http://www.marvel-figurines.co.uk - Official site
 http://www.marvelactionfigures.org/
https://www.mycollectionshop.com/ - Official figurine and magazine distributor

Marvel
Toy figurines
Marvel Comics action figure lines
Marvel Comics encyclopedias